Jens Rohde (born 18 April 1970) is a Danish politician, who is a member of the Folketing for the Christian Democrats political party. He served as a Member of the European Parliament (MEP) from 2014 until 2019, as a member of the Danish Social Liberal Party, part of the Alliance of Liberals and Democrats for Europe. He is currently a member of the Christian Democrats.

Political career
Between 1998 and 2005, Rohde represented Venstre in the Danish parliament, where he served as his parliamentary group's spokesperson on media policy. From 2001 to 2005 he was a member of the municipal council of Viborg Municipality.

In the 2014 European elections, Rohde was elected as a member of European Parliament as a member of the Venstre political party. Rohde represented the ALDE group in Parliament. Between 2009 and 2014, he served as Vice-Chairman of the Committee on Industry, Research and Energy. From 2014, he was a member of the Committee on Agriculture and Rural Development, where served as the ALDE group's coordinator. In addition, he served as the ALDE group's shadow rapporteur for telecoms regulation.

In December 2015, Rohde moved to the Danish Social Liberal Party in protest at a proposal of the Rasmussen government to give immigration authorities the power to search asylum-seekers’ clothes and luggage and to seize valuables and cash. In January 2021 Rhode left the Social Liberal Party. He later joined the Christian Democrats, becoming that party's first sitting MP since 2010.

References

External links
 

Living people
1970 births
People from Holstebro
Danish Social Liberal Party politicians
Danish Social Liberal Party MEPs
Venstre (Denmark) politicians
Venstre (Denmark) MEPs
Christian Democrats (Denmark) politicians
MEPs for Denmark 2009–2014
MEPs for Denmark 2014–2019
Members of the Folketing 1998–2001
Members of the Folketing 2001–2005
Members of the Folketing 2005–2007
Members of the Folketing 2019–2022
Danish municipal councillors